B68 or B-68 may refer to:
 Barnard 68, a molecular cloud and likely star-formation site
 B68 (New York City bus) in Brooklyn
 B68 Toftir, a Faroese football club
 Sicilian Defence in the Encyclopaedia of Chess Openings
 Bundesstraße 68, a GErman road
 Martin XB-68 (none built), an experimental American aircraft
 B-68 Titan